Salt Creek or Rio Salitroso is a tributary stream or wash of the Amargosa River, in San Bernardino County, California.  It was named Rio Salitroso, on January 16, 1830, by Antonio Armijo, whose expedition subsequently followed it up towards the Mojave River, as they established the first route of the Old Spanish Trail.
 

Soda Lake may drain into the Dry Sand Lake in Salt Creek's upper reach  through a wash from Silver Lake in extremely rare wet years when both lakes fill and overflow with water from rain or from the Mojave River.

References

Rivers of Southern California
Rivers of San Bernardino County, California